There are eight recognised candidates for membership of the European Union: Turkey (since 1999), North Macedonia (2005), Montenegro (2010), Serbia (2012), Albania (2014), Moldova (2022), Ukraine (2022), and Bosnia and Herzegovina (2022). Kosovo (whose independence is not recognised by five EU member states) and Georgia formally submitted applications for membership in 2022 and are considered potential candidates by the European Union.

Montenegro and Serbia, the most advanced candidates, are expected to join earlier than the others. Due to multiple factors, talks with Turkey are at an effective standstill.

The accession criteria are included in the Copenhagen criteria, agreed in 1993, and the Treaty of Maastricht (Article 49). Article 49 of the Maastricht Treaty (as amended) says that any "European state" that respects the "principles of liberty, democracy, respect for human rights and fundamental freedoms, and the rule of law", may apply to join the EU. Whether a country is European or not is subject to political assessment by the EU institutions. Past enlargement since the foundation of the European Union as the European Economic Community by the Inner Six states in 1958 brought total membership of the EU to twenty-eight, although as a result of the withdrawal of the United Kingdom, the current number of EU member states is twenty-seven.

Of the four major western European countries that are not EU members, Norway, Switzerland and Iceland have submitted membership applications in the past but subsequently frozen or withdrawn them, while the United Kingdom is a former member. Norway, Switzerland, Iceland, as well as Liechtenstein, participate in the EU Single Market and also in the Schengen Area, which makes them closely aligned with the EU; none, however, are in the EU Customs Union.

Current agenda and applicants

The present enlargement agenda of the European Union regards three distinct groups of states:
 Western Balkans: Albania, Bosnia and Herzegovina, Kosovo, Montenegro, North Macedonia, and Serbia.
 Association Trio: Georgia, Moldova, and Ukraine.
 Turkey.

These states must negotiate the terms of their EU accession with the current member states, and align their domestic legislation with EU law before joining.

There are other states in Europe that either seek membership or could potentially apply if their present foreign policy changes or the EU gives a signal that they might now be included on the enlargement agenda. However, these are not formally part of the current agenda, which is already delayed due to bilateral disputes in the Balkans and difficulty in fully implementing the acquis communautaire (the accepted body of EU law).

It was previously the norm for enlargements to see multiple entrants join the Union at once. The only previous enlargements of a single state were the 1981 admission of Greece and the 2013 admission of Croatia. However, the EU members have warned that, following the significant impact of the fifth enlargement in 2004, a more individual approach will be adopted in the future, although the entry of pairs or small groups of countries will most probably coincide.

Western Balkans 

The 2003 European Council summit in Thessaloniki set the integration of the Western Balkans as a priority of EU expansion. This commitment was made in order to stabilise the region in the wake of the Yugoslav Wars, a series of ethnic wars through the 1990s that led to the break-up of Yugoslavia.

Slovenia was the first former Yugoslav country to join the EU in 2004, followed by Croatia in 2013.

Albania, Bosnia and Herzegovina, Montenegro, North Macedonia, and Serbia have all been officially granted candidate status. Kosovo, which is not recognised by 5 EU states nor by Serbia, applied on 14 December 2022 and is considered a potential candidate by the European Union.

Serbia and Montenegro have started accession negotiations and may join the EU in 2025.

The European Council had endorsed starting negotiations with Albania and North Macedonia on 26 March 2020, however, the negotiation process was blocked by Bulgaria for over two years. In June 2022 French President Emmanuel Macron submitted a compromise proposal which, if adopted by both countries, would pave the way for the immediate adoption of negotiating frameworks for North Macedonia and Albania by the EU Council and for the organization of intergovernmental conferences with them. On 24 June 2022, Bulgaria's parliament approved the revised French proposal to lift the country's veto on opening EU accession talks with North Macedonia, with the Assembly of North Macedonia also doing so on 16 July 2022 allowing accession negotiations to begin. On the same day, the restart of negotiations was set for July 19, 2022.

Association Trio 

In 2005, the European Commission suggested in a strategy paper that the present enlargement agenda could potentially block the possibility of a future accession of Armenia, Azerbaijan, Belarus, Georgia, Moldova, and Ukraine. Olli Rehn, the European Commissioner for Enlargement between 2004 and 2010, said on the occasion that the EU should "avoid overstretching our capacity, and instead consolidate our enlargement agenda," adding, "this is already a challenging agenda for our accession process."

Georgia, Moldova, and Ukraine ratified an Association Agreement with the EU, and the European Parliament passed a resolution in 2014 stating that "in accordance with Article 49 of the Treaty on European Union, Georgia, Moldova, and Ukraine, as well as any other European country, have a European perspective, can apply for EU membership in compliance with the principles of democracy, respect for fundamental freedoms and human rights, minority rights and ensuring the rule of rights." They also entered the Deep and Comprehensive Free Trade Area with the EU, which creates "framework for modernising [...] trade relations and for economic development by the opening of markets via the progressive removal of customs tariffs and quotas, and by an extensive harmonisation of laws, norms and regulations in various trade-related sectors, creating the conditions for aligning key sectors" of their economies with EU standards. However, the EU did not expand further into the post-Soviet space in the 2010s.

By January 2021, Georgia and Ukraine were preparing to formally apply for EU membership in 2024. However, following the 2022 Russian invasion of Ukraine, Ukraine submitted an application for EU membership on 28 February 2022, followed by Georgia and Moldova on 3 March 2022. On 23 June 2022, the European Council granted candidate status to Moldova and Ukraine, and recognized Georgia as a potential candidate for membership.

Turkey 

Turkey's candidacy to join the EU has been a matter of major significance and considerable controversy since it was granted in 1999. Turkey has had historically close ties with the EU, having an association agreement since 1964, being in a customs union with the EU since 1995 and initially applying to join in 1987. Only after a summit in Brussels on 17 December 2004 (following the major 2004 enlargement) did the European Council announce that membership negotiations with Turkey were officially opened on 3 October 2005.

Turkey is the eleventh largest economy in the world, and is a key regional power. In 2006, Carl Bildt, former Swedish foreign minister, stated that "[The accession of Turkey] would give the EU a decisive role for stability in the Eastern part of the Mediterranean and the Black Sea, which is clearly in the strategic interest of Europe."

However, others, such as former French President Nicolas Sarkozy and former German Chancellor Angela Merkel, opposed Turkey's membership. Opponents argue that Turkey does not respect the key principles that are expected in a liberal democracy, such as the freedom of expression. Turkey's large population would also alter the balance of power in the representative European institutions. Upon joining the EU, Turkey's 84 million inhabitants would bestow it the largest number of MEPs in the European Parliament. It would become the most populous country in the EU.
Another problem is that Turkey does not recognise one EU state, Cyprus, because of the Cyprus problem and the Cypriot government blocks some chapters of Turkey's talks.

Turkey's relations with the EU have seriously deteriorated in the aftermath of the 2016 Turkish coup d'état attempt and subsequent purges. On 24 November 2016, the European Parliament approved a non-binding resolution calling for the "temporary freeze of the ongoing accession negotiations with Turkey" over human rights and rule of law concerns. On 13 December, the European Council (comprising the heads of state or government of the member states) resolved that it would open no new areas in Turkey's membership talks in the "prevailing circumstances", as Turkey's path toward autocratic rule made progress on EU accession impossible. As of 2022, and especially following Erdoğan's victory in the constitutional referendum, Turkish accession talks are effectively at a standstill.

Summary table

Timeline

Level of preparation for acquis chapters 
Level of preparation for adopting the acquis communautaire in each policy area, according to the 2022/2023 European Commission reports.

States not on the agenda

The Maastricht Treaty (Article 49) states that any European country (as defined by a European Council assessment) that is committed to democracy may apply for membership in the European Union. In addition to European states, other countries have also been speculated or proposed as future members of the EU.

Sovereign states
States in Europe that have chosen, for various reasons, not to join the EU have integrated with it to different extents according to their circumstances. Iceland, Norway, and Liechtenstein participate directly in the single market via the EEA, Switzerland does so via bilateral treaties and the other European microstates (Andorra, Monaco, San Marino, Vatican City) have specific agreements with the EU and neighbouring countries, including their use of the euro as their currency. Most of these countries are also part of the Schengen Area. Norway, Iceland, and Switzerland have all previously had live applications to join the EU, which have been withdrawn or otherwise frozen. Such applications could be resubmitted in the event of a change in the political landscape.

Other proposals
 Andorra, Liechtenstein, Monaco, and Vatican City are European microstates that are not on the agenda of the EU to be members, nor their own. See: Microstates and the European Union.
 Azerbaijan and Kazakhstan are transcontinental states. These countries are not on the agenda of the EU to be members, nor their own. See: Azerbaijan–European Union relations and Kazakhstan–European Union relations.
 Canada is a non-European country with values, culture, trade, and politics closely linked with the EU. Its membership has been proposed due to this. See: Canada–European Union relations.
 Cape Verde and Israel are non-European countries with close historical and political relations with the EU. See: Cape Verde–European Union relations and Israel–European Union relations.
 The Order of Malta is a sovereign entity without territory that has extraterritorial headquarters in Palazzo Malta and Villa Malta, as well as observer status in the United Nations and the Council of Europe. See: Sovereign Military Order of Malta–European Union relations.

Non-sovereign states

Scotland

Despite Scotland voting to stay, the United Kingdom as a whole left the European Union in 2020, leaving potential future membership for Scotland as enlargement from outside of the EU. The Scottish National Party (SNP) which leads Scotland's devolved government supports re-joining the EU should Scotland become independent in the future.

Internal enlargement scenarios

Internal enlargement is the process of new member states arising from the break-up of or secession from an existing member state. There have been and are a number of active separatist movements within member states (for example in Catalonia and Flanders) but there are no clear agreements, treaties or precedents covering the scenario of an existing EU member state breaking into two or more states, both of which wish to remain EU member states. The question is whether one state is a successor and one a new applicant or, alternatively, both are new states which must be admitted to the EU.

In some cases, a region desires to leave its state and the EU, namely those regions wishing to join Switzerland. But most, namely the two movements that held referendums during the 2010s, Scotland and Catalonia, see their future as independent states within the EU. This results in great interest in whether, once independent, they would retain EU membership or conversely whether they would have to re-apply. In the later case, since new members must be approved unanimously, any other state which has an interest in blocking their membership to deter similar independence movements could do so. Additionally, it is unclear whether the successor state would retain any opt-outs that the parent state was entitled to.

 Opinions on membership
  European Commission
 Jean-Claude Juncker, President of the European Commission (2014-2019): "If there were to be a 'yes' vote in favour of Catalan independence, then we will respect that opinion. But Catalonia will not be able to be an EU member state on the day after such a vote." This was repeated in October in an official press release: "We [...] reiterate the legal position held by this Commission as well as by its predecessors. If a referendum were to be organised in line with the Spanish Constitution it would mean that the territory leaving would find itself outside of the European Union."
 José Manuel Barroso, President of the European Commission (2004-2014), stated in 2012 in the context of the 2014 referendum for independence in Scotland, that any newly independent country would have to apply for membership and negotiate its terms, but that the rest of the original country would not have to re-negotiate its position and would continue its membership. In 2014 he said that it would have been 'very difficult' for an independent Scotland to join the EU, 'if not impossible', because of the difficulty of getting the approval of all member states, particularly Spain, which fears a possible secession of Catalonia and has blocked Kosovo's accession to the EU.
 Joaquín Almunia (Spanish, being at the time an EU Commissioner) in 2013 claimed that Catalonia would have to apply for EU membership in the event of secession from Spain.
  Government of Spain
 Spanish Prime Minister Mariano Rajoy, said in November 2013 that an independent Scotland's entry to the EU would require the consent of all existing members and that an independent Scotland or other regions gaining independence, taken as a reference to Catalonia, would end up outside of the EU.
 Spanish Foreign Minister José García-Margallo, having said in February 2012 that Spain would not veto Scottish accession to the EU, provided Scottish independence had UK agreement (thus making it different from Catalan independence).

Basque Country

The presence of a strong Basque Nationalist movement, strongly majoritary in several territories of the Basque Country, makes possible the future existence of an independent Basque Country under different potential territorial configurations. In overall terms the Basque nationalism is pro-European.

Catalonia

On 1 October 2017, the Catalan government held a referendum on independence, which had been declared illegal by the Constitutional Court of Spain, with potential polling stations being cordoned off by riot police. The subsequent events constituted a political crisis for Catalonia. The EU's position is to keep distance from the crisis while supporting Spain's territorial integrity and constitution. While the debate around Scotland's referendum may inform the Catalan crisis, Catalonia is in a distinct situation from Scotland whereby the central government does not recognise the legitimacy of any independence declaration from Catalonia. If Spain does not recognise the independence of a Catalan state, Catalonia cannot separately join the EU and it is still recognised as part of Spain's EU membership.

Corsica

Corsica has a strong and electorally successful nationalist movement, with positions ranging from autonomy to outright independence, the latter option with around 10–15% public support. The independist party Corsica Libera envisions an independent Corsica within the European Union as a union of various European peoples, as well as recommendations for alignment within European directives.

Flanders

There is an active movement towards Flemish independence or union with the Netherlands. The future status of Wallonia and Brussels (the de facto capital of the EU) are unclear as viable political states, perhaps producing a unique situation from Scotland and Catalonia. There are various proposals, both within and outside the independentist movement, for what should happen to Brussels, ranging from staying part of the Belgian rump state, to joining the hypothetical Flemish state, to become a separate political entity.

Sardinia

Sardinia has a strong and electorally successful nationalist movement, with positions ranging from autonomy to outright independence.

As the Sardinian movement has its origins on the left of the political spectrum It is mostly pro-european, with a key focus on environmentalism.

According to a 2012 survey conducted in a joint effort between the University of Cagliari and that of Edinburgh, 41% of Sardinians would be in favour of independence (with 10% choosing it from both Italy and the European Union, and 31% only from Italy with Sardinia remaining in the EU), whilst another 46% would rather have a larger autonomy within Italy and the EU, including fiscal power; 12% of people would be content to remain part of Italy and the EU with a Regional Council without any fiscal powers, and 1% in Italy and the EU without a Regional Council and fiscal powers. A 2017 poll by the Ixè Institute found that 51% of those questioned identified as Sardinian (as opposed to an Italian average of 15% identifying by their region of origin), rather than Italian (19%), European (11%) and/or citizen of the world (19%).

Sardinian nationalists address a number of issues, such as the environmental damage caused by the military forces (about 60% of such bases in Italy are located on the island), the financial and economic exploitation of the island's resources by the Italian state and mainland industrialists, the lack of any political representation both in Italy and in the European Parliament (due to an unbalanced electoral constituency that still remains to this day, Sardinia has not had its own MEP since 1994), the nuclear power and waste (on which a referendum was proposed by a Sardist party, being held in 2011) and the ongoing process of depopulation and Italianization that would destroy the Sardinian indigenous culture.

Wallonia

There is a separatist movement in Wallonia although secession of Flanders from Belgium seems more likely. There is also a movement for a union with France. Although the majority is Francophone, the Walloon movement includes the Allemanophones. There are various proposals, both within and outside the independentist movement, for what should happen to Brussels.

Member state expansion scenarios

Cyprus

Officially, the island nation of Cyprus is part of the European Union, under the de jure sovereignty of the Republic of Cyprus. Turkish Cypriots are citizens of the Republic of Cyprus and thus of the European Union, and were entitled to vote in the 2004 European Parliament election (though only a few hundred registered). The EU's acquis communautaire is suspended indefinitely in the northern third of the island, which has remained outside the control of the Republic of Cyprus since the Turkish invasion of 1974. The Greek Cypriot community rejected the Annan Plan for the settlement of the Cyprus dispute in a referendum on 24 April 2004. Had the referendum been in favour of the settlement proposal, the island (excluding the British Sovereign Base Areas) would have joined the European Union as the United Cyprus Republic. The European Union's relations with the Turkish Cypriot Community are handled by the European Commission's Directorate-General for Enlargement.

Ireland

The European Council has recognised that following the UK withdrawal from the EU, if Northern Ireland were to be incorporated into a united Ireland it would automatically rejoin the EU under the current Irish membership. A historical precedent for this was the incorporation of East Germany into the Federal Republic of Germany as a single European Communities member state.

Romania

A similar scenario has been envisioned with the unification of Moldova and Romania, which would incorporate the current territory of Moldova into Romania and therefore into the EU. About 44% of the Moldovans that were polled in 2021 supported such a scenario.

Possible incorporation of special member state territories

There are multiple special member state territories, some of which are not fully covered by the EU treaties and apply EU law only partially, if at all. It is possible for a dependency to change its status regarding the EU or some particular treaty or law provision. The territory may change its status from participation to leaving or from being outside to joining.

Danish self-governing territories

Faroe Islands

The Faroe Islands, a self-governing nation within the Kingdom of Denmark, is not part of the EU, as explicitly asserted by both Rome treaties. The relations with the EU are governed by a Fisheries Agreement (1977) and a Free Trade Agreement (1991, revised 1998). The main reason for remaining outside the EU is disagreements about the Common Fisheries Policy, which disfavours countries with large fish resources. Also, every member has to pay for the Common Agricultural Policy, which favours countries having much agriculture which the Faroe Islands does not. When Iceland was in membership negotiations around 2010, there was a hope of better conditions for fish-rich countries, but to no avail. The Common Fisheries Policy was introduced in 1970 for the very reason of getting access for the first EC members to waters of candidate countries, namely the United Kingdom, Ireland, and Denmark including the Faroe Islands.

Nevertheless, there are politicians, mainly in the right-wing Union Party (Sambandsflokkurin), led by their chairman Kaj Leo Johannesen, who would like to see the Faroes as a member of the EU. However, the chairman of the left-wing Republic (Tjóðveldi), Høgni Hoydal, has expressed concerns that if the Faroes were to join the EU as is, they might vanish inside the EU, comparing this with the situation of the Shetland Islands and Åland today, and wants the local government to solve the political situation between the Faroes and Denmark first.

Greenland

Greenland is part of the Kingdom of Denmark, which meant it became part of the EEC when Denmark joined in 1973. After the establishment of Greenland's home rule in 1979, which made it an autonomous community, Greenland held a referendum on EEC membership. The result was (mainly because of the Common Fisheries Policy) to leave, so on 1 February 1985, Greenland left the EEC and EURATOM. Its status was changed to that of an Overseas Country. Danish nationals residing in Greenland (i.e. all native population) are nonetheless fully European citizens; they are not, however, entitled to vote in European elections.

There has been some speculation as to whether Greenland may consider joining again the now-European Union. On 4 January 2007, the Danish daily Jyllands-Posten quoted the former Danish minister for Greenland, Tom Høyem, as saying "I would not be surprised if Greenland again becomes a member of the EU... The EU needs the Arctic window and Greenland cannot alone manage the gigantic Arctic possibilities". Greenland has a lot of natural resources, and Greenland has, especially during the 2000s commodities boom, contracted foreign private companies to exploit some of them, but the cost is considered too high, as Greenland is remote and severely lacks infrastructure which has to be built. After 2013 prices declined so such efforts stalled.

The Brexit debate has reignited talk about the EU in Greenland with calls for the island to join the Union again.

Dutch Caribbean territories
The islands of Aruba and Curaçao, as well as Sint Maarten, are constituent countries of the Kingdom of the Netherlands, while Bonaire, Sint Eustatius and Saba are special Dutch municipalities. All are Overseas Countries and Territories (OCT) under Annex II of the EC treaty. OCTs are considered to be "associated" with the EU and apply some portions of EU law. The islands are opting to become an Outermost Region (OMR) of the EU, a status in which the islands form a part of the European Union, though they benefit from derogations (exceptions) from some EU laws due to their geographical remoteness from mainland Europe. The islands are focusing on gaining the same status as the Azores, Madeira, the Canary Islands, and the French overseas departments.

When Bonaire, Sint Eustatius, and Saba were established as Dutch public bodies after the dissolution of the Netherlands Antilles (which was an OCT) in 2010, their status within the EU was raised. Rather than change their status from an OCT to an outermost region, as their change in status within the Netherlands would imply, it was decided that their status would remain the same for at least five years. After those five years, their status would be reviewed.

If it was decided that one or all of the islands wish to integrate more with the EU then the Treaty of Lisbon provides for that following a unanimous decision from the European Council. Former European Commissioner for Enlargement Danuta Hübner has said before the European Parliament that she does not expect many problems to occur with such a status change, as the population of the islands is only a few thousand people.

French overseas departments and territories
The territories of French Guiana, Guadeloupe, Martinique, Mayotte and Réunion are overseas departments of France and at the same time mono-departmental overseas regions. According to the EC treaty (article 299 2), all of these departments are outermost regions (OMR) of the EU—hence provisions of the EC treaty apply there while derogations are allowed. The status of the Overseas collectivity of Saint-Martin is also defined as OMR by the Treaty of Lisbon. New Caledonia and the overseas collectivities of French Polynesia, Saint-Barthelemy, Saint Pierre and Miquelon as well as Wallis and Futuna are Overseas Countries and Territories of the EU.

New Caledonia
New Caledonia is an overseas territory of France with its own unique status under the French Constitution, which is distinct from that of overseas departments and collectivities. It is defined as an "overseas country" under the 1998 Nouméa Accord, and enjoys a high degree of self-government. Currently, in regard to the EU, it is one of the Overseas Countries and Territories (OCT).

As a result of the Nouméa Accord, New Caledonians voted in three consecutive independence referendums in 2018, 2020, and 2021. The referendums were to determine whether the territory would remain a part of the French Republic as a "sui generis collectivity", or whether it would become an independent state. The accords also specify a gradual devolution of powers to the local New Caledonian assembly. The results of all three referendums determined that New Caledonia would remain a part of the French Republic.

Former possibility

The Scottish Independence Referendum of 2014 was the first occasion the EU was faced with the potential break-up of a member state, and one where a newly independent state wished to retain its EU membership. While the UK's withdrawal from the EU also took Scotland out of the EU, the debates in the referendum campaign may inform other future scenarios.

The UK Government's legal advice on the issue was that 'Since the [remainder of the UK] would be the same state as the UK, its EU membership would continue', while speculating that 'On the face of it, Scotland would be required to accede to the EU as a new state, which would require negotiations on the terms of its membership ...', but that 'Scotland's position within the EU is likely to be shaped more by any agreements between the parties than by pre-existing principles of EU law.' Without any formal process for handling the break-up of any member state, the European Commission offered, if requested by a member state, to provide an official view on the EU's position on Scottish EU membership in the event of its independence from the UK. The Scottish Government requested that UK Prime Minister David Cameron place this request, but such a request was not made. Nicola Sturgeon, the then Deputy First Minister of Scotland, said that the Scottish Cabinet did not agree an independent Scotland would have to reapply for EU membership.

The referendum campaigns had differing views:
 Yes Scotland: The "Yes" campaign, led by Blair Jenkins, argued that Scotland would continue as a member state following a Yes vote as Scotland would remain compliant with all EU Principles as outlined in TEU Article 2 and there are no provisions to exclude a state in the existing EU agreements. During the period between a Yes vote and formal independence, the Scottish Government could engage in negotiations, from within the EU, on the terms of their continuing membership in the EU. Several EU heads of state expressed their opinion that this position was reasonable, as did James Crawford, co-author of the UK government's legal advice on the issue. In an interview on BBC Radio, asked if the timescale of 18 months for EU and other treaty organisation was possible, Crawford replied that he felt the timescale was reasonable. However, there was no official comment on this view from the EU Commission. The Scottish Government and the Yes Campaign both declared that continuation of membership in the EU is their preference.
 Better Together: The "No" campaign, led by Alistair Darling, argued that any vote for independence would have automatically placed Scotland out of the EU as a new state, and Scotland would have had to renegotiate entry.

The United Kingdom as a whole left the European Union in 2020, leaving potential future membership for Scotland as enlargement from outside of the EU.

See also
 Eastern Partnership
 Euronest Parliamentary Assembly
 European integration
 Instrument for Pre-Accession Assistance, a funding mechanism for EU candidate countries
 Politics of Europe
 Treaty of Accession 2011
 Withdrawal from the European Union

Notes

References

External links
 Joining the EU – Europa (web portal)
 European Union Member States and applicant countries – European NAvigator
 
 

Enlargement of the European Union
 
Lists of proposals
Public policy proposals